De De Lind was a short-lived Italian progressive rock band active in the early 1970s. The band only released one album and four singles over the five years of its existence.

History
De De Lind was formed in 1969 in the northern Italian city of Varese, and was named after DeDe Lind, a popular 60s Playboy model. Beginning as a beat band, as was common at the time, they eventually evolved towards progressive rock in the early 1970s. They are primarily known for their 1973 album, Io non so da dove vengo e non so dove mai andrò. Uomo è il nome che mi han dato, one of the most disputed examples of Italian progressive rock.

Discography

LP
Io non so da dove vengo e non so dove mai andrò. Uomo è il nome che mi han dato (1973)

Singles
Anche se sei qui / Come si fa? (1969)
Mille anni / Ti devo lasciare (1970)
Signore dove vai? / Torneremo ancora (1971)
Fuga e morte / Paura del niente (1973)

Further reading

References

Italian progressive rock groups
Musical groups established in 1969